Wendy McKamey (born December 15, 1946) is an American politician who has served in the Montana House of Representatives since 2015.

Political career 
McKamey was first elected in 2014, in a race decided by just 16 votes, to represent District 23 in the Montana House of Representatives. In 2016, she was elected to represent District 19; she was re-elected to that position in 2018, and is running again in 2020.

McKamey currently sits on the following committees: State Administration (Vice Chair), Agriculture, and Education.

In 2021, McKamey proposed legislation to restrict voting rights in Montana. The legislation prohibited ballot collection, which at the time was common in communities where election infrastructure was limited, such as the Native American community in Montana, which is a Democratic-leaning constituency. The legislation was passed by the Republican-controlled State Legislature. The legislation came amid a nationwide push by Republicans to restrict voting rights after Donald Trump lost the 2020 election and refused to concede while he and other Republicans made false claims of fraud. McKamey defended the voting restrictions, saying "There are going to be habits that are going to have to change because we need to keep our security at the utmost"; there was no evidence of significant voter fraud in Montana.

Electoral record

References

1946 births
Living people
Republican Party members of the Montana House of Representatives
Politicians from Great Falls, Montana
Women state legislators in Montana
21st-century American politicians
21st-century American women politicians